The Saint Joseph's–Temple rivalry is a college rivalry between the Hawks of Saint Joseph's University and the Owls of Temple University. The rivalry is rich in history and is particularly intense in men's basketball. Both schools are located in Philadelphia, are members of the Big 5. Many of the games are played at the Palestra on the University of Pennsylvania's campus. The rivalry is the second most anticipated in the Big 5 after the Holy War between Villanova and Saint Joseph's.

The rivalry intensified when John Chaney sent in a player, Nehemiah Ingram, to intentionally foul Saint Joseph's senior John Bryant in 2005. Bryant, co-captain of the Saint Joseph's squad, ended up with a broken arm and an end to his college career. John Chaney ultimately retired but the immediate consequences were light.

The rivalry is still intense but became friendlier after Fran Dunphy became coach of Temple in 2006. Both Dunphy and Phil Martelli are close friends. The student bodies of each school still share hate for one another as Saint Joseph's students refer to Temple as "Thug U" and Temple students return the favor by calling SJU "St. Blows".

Results

References

College basketball rivalries in the United States
Philadelphia Big 5
Sports in Philadelphia
Saint Joseph's Hawks
Temple Owls